James C. Slife (born 1967) is a lieutenant general who serves as the deputy chief of staff for operations of the United States Air Force since December 2022. 

He served as the commander of Air Force Special Operations Command from June 2019 to December 2022, having previously served as the vice commander from July 2018 to June 2019 and chief of staff from June 2017 to June 2018 of United States Special Operations Command. Slife was commissioned through the ROTC program at Auburn University in 1989.

Awards and decorations

References

1967 births
Auburn University alumni
Embry–Riddle Aeronautical University alumni
George Washington University alumni
Living people
Recipients of the Defense Superior Service Medal
Recipients of the Legion of Merit
United States Air Force generals
United States Air Force personnel of the Gulf War
United States Air Force personnel of the Iraq War
United States Air Force personnel of the War in Afghanistan (2001–2021)